Skyline Trail can refer to at least six different nature trails:

 the trail in Jasper National Park in Alberta or 
 the trail in the Berkeley-Oakland hills, part of Skyline Gardens Project. 
 the trail that is part of the Cape Breton Highlands National Park in Nova Scotia or 
 the trail that is located in the Pecos Wilderness of the Carson and Santa Fe National Forests in New Mexico, or
 the lower portion of the Cactus to Clouds Trail in California or
 the trail in Mount Rainier National Park, or
 the trail in the Malheur National Forest in Oregon or
 the Oregon Skyline Trail, the predecessor trail to the Pacific Crest Trail in Oregon